GASAG (English: Berlin Gas Works Corporation) is the main natural gas supplier and vendor in Berlin, Germany.

References

External links

Official site
 

Economy of Berlin
Natural gas companies of Germany